In a loading dock, one problem to overcome is the problem of bridging the gap between a truck and the dock or warehouse floor. Not all trucks are the same height, and the height of the trailer floor within a truck can vary according to how heavily the truck is laden. Thus there is not only a gap to bridge but a height difference to overcome. Various devices are employed in order to achieve this: dock plates, dock levelers, dock boards, and various forms of lift. These devices vary in construction, suitability to dock conditions, cost of installation, and loading capacity.

Dock levelers and lifts are generally permanent fixtures at each door of a dock. Dock plates and dock boards are generally, by contrast, portable, and not fixed either to dock or truck.

Dock plates and dock boards are simply metal ramps, bridging the gaps between dock and truck.  Dock plates are generally made out of aluminium whilst dock boards are generally made out of steel. Aluminium dock plates are thus more suitable for lighter loads, such as handcarts and dollies, whereas steel dock boards are more suitable for heavier motorized equipment such as fork lift trucks and electric pallet trucks. Another difference between dock plates and dock boards, in addition to their load-bearing capabilities, is their construction. Dock plates are simple flat plates, whereas dock boards have curbs, bolted or welded to the edge of the board. Run-off is prevented by a simple painted yellow strip along the edge of a dock plate, whereas it is the curbs (also generally painted yellow) that prevent run-off on dock boards; these curbs are also where the higher weight capacities of dock boards come from. Run-off is thus a significant risk on dock plates, since the yellow strip is not a particularly effective mechanism for preventing it.

Both dock plates and dock boards have a diamond pattern embossed onto their upper surfaces, to prevent wheel slip as carts and vehicles travel up and down the incline. Similarly, they both have locking T-bar legs that extend down into the gap between truck and dock, to secure them. They are both portable. But dock boards are heavier than dock plates. The latter may be carried by hand, and are generally fitted with handles for doing so. The former usually require a fork lift in order to place and remove them, and are generally fitted with either loops or chains, used for attaching the dock board to the forks of the fork lift.

Dock levelers are, as mentioned, fixed to the dock. They comprise a simple metal plate, called a lip, that is raised from a stowed position and then lowered onto the back of the truck. Lip can be hinged or telescopic type. They are operated either manually, via a simple pull chain, or hydraulically, (most common) with an electric pump driving a piston to lift the plate and another one to move the lip.

Dock levelers are more expensive devices than the comparatively light-weight dock plates and dock boards. The most common form of dock leveler is the recessed, or pit, dock leveler. As the name suggests, this type of leveler is contained in a recess, or pit, beneath the dock door and floor surface. Dock levelers are stronger than dock plates and have similar ranges to dock boards, making them suitable not only for motorized fork lift trucks but also for master conveyors (for which neither dock plates or dock boards are suitable). Safety, also, is very high for this kind of product: Safety rules as EN1398 (European Standard) specifies the safety requirements for design, construction, installation, maintenance and testing of dock levelers and for safety components on dock levelers. NOTE: edge of dock levelers have fixed positions which have restricted ranges making them unsuitable for nonstandard dock heights. 

Because they carry heavy motorized equipment, the grade of the incline has to be shallow. The greater the height differential between truck and dock that a dock leveler can compensate for, the longer the leveler itself has to be. Moreover, the grade of the incline must not be so great that the vehicles cannot climb it. A height differential of between 7 and 8 inches generally requires a  leveler for an electric palette carrier. A height differential of between 17 and 18 inches generally requires a  leveler for a petrol-engined fork lift truck. Anyway, the lip has to be considered in the length of the leveler, as it is part of it. A telescopic lip (20 or 40 inches) can help to reduce the length of the leveler to 10 feet.

Dock levelers (and indeed dock plates and dock boards) are used where a building has a truck-level door, i.e. a door with a floor level roughly at the same height as the floor of the truck's trailer. Some buildings only have drive-in doors, i.e. doors at the same level as the ground outside of the building, suitable for driving directly into the building.

For loading docks with drive-in doors, and also (albeit rarely) for loading docks with truck-level doors, a lift is sometimes employed.

Other, less common, devices employed when bridging the gap between truck and dock are truck levelers. These are hydraulic lifts positioned beneath the rear wheels of the truck, that are used to raise and lower the truck so that it is level with the loading dock edge. The problems with truck levelers, that make them rarely employed, are twofold. First: They cause the truck interior to be at an incline, which causes loading and unloading difficulties. Second: They are expensive to maintain, since they require (being below ground level and open to the air) proper drainage and protection against the weather.

Recessed dock levelers also have problems of exposure to the weather. However, because they are recessed into the dock, which is above ground level, they do not have as great a problem with drainage. Equally, because they are recessed into the dock, they extend partially back from the dock edge. A dock leveler can be installed so that it extends inside the loading dock door, and thus inside the building, protecting it from the weather.

References 

Warehouses
Trucks